Kulon Progo Regency is one of the four regencies within the Yogyakarta Special Region, Indonesia. It is located on the island of Java. The regency's name stems from the fact that it is situated to the west (in Javanese "kulon") of the Progo River. The capital is Wates. The greatest part of the population of the regency work as farmers. Kulon Progo Regency is surrounded by the Menoreh Hills. The area of the regency is 586.27 km2, and the population was 388,755 at the 2010 census and 436,395 at the 2020 census.

History
In 1674, Keraton Mataram, Yogyakarta was attacked by Trunojoyo who received assistance from Macassar, resulting in damage to the palace and the king Amangkurat I had to flee and asked the Netherlands for help, till he died in Tegal during flight.

To anticipate attacks from Trunojoyo's followers, in 1677 the palace of Mataram led by Amangkurat II as the crown prince of Amangkurat I asked for the regent Ponorogo to obtain the palace protection by bala Warok famous skilled in war and asked for help from the Dutch colonial to capture Trunojoyo. 
After Mataram palace was guarded by Warok of Ponorogo, Tronojoyo had difficulties to penetrate the palace and was arrested and finally sentenced to death in 1679.

The Warok who managed to protect the palace got the prize a place to stay in the west of Mataram palace to facilitate the palace defence in case of an attack against the palace. The place was named Kulon Ponorogo and is now known as Kulon Progo which means Keraton Mataram western Ponorogo.

The area which currently includes the district of Kulon Progo until the end of Dutch colonial rule is the territory of two districts, namely Kulon Progo which is a region of the Sultanate Ngayogyakarta and District Adikarto which is a region of the Duchy Pakualaman. Both districts were merged into Kulon Progo administration on October 15, 1951.

Administrative districts
Kulon Progo Regency is divided into twelve districts (kapanewon), listed below with their areas and their populations at the 2010 census and the 2020 census.

 Temon (24,471)
 Wates (43,995)
 Panjatan (33,397)
 Galur (29,120)
 Lendah (36,447)
 Sentolo (44,525)
 Pengasih (45,175)
 Kokap (31,124)
 Girimulyo (21,893)
 Nanggulan (27,239)
 Kalibawang (26,802)
 Samigaluh (24,681)

Forestry
Some local development efforts, carried on with the support of local cooperatives, work towards reafforestation activities.  Trees being planted in the regency for both commercial and social reasons include Jati (Teak or Tecnona grandis), Mahogany (Swietenia mahagoni), Albasia (Albizia), and sono keliling (Blackwood or Rosewoon, Dalbergia latifolia'').

Yogyakarta International Airport

The central Indonesian government has indicated that a new airport for the Yogyakarta Special Region will be located in the Kulon Progo Regency.  The plan is to build an airport with a 3,250 metre runway with 45 meters width and dual linear terminals to serve as an international gateway. The initial plan is to provide facilities to serve up to 10 million passengers per year for 28 aircraft together.  Later expansions might accommodate up to 20 million passengers per year in phase-3. Around 637 hectares of land is being set aside for the project.  Of this, 40% is classified as "Paku Alam (Sultan)" land while the rest belongs to local communities. The location is in Temon District between Congot Beach and Glagah Beach (which covers Palihan village, Sindutan village, Jangkaran village and Glagah village). In August 2013, 75 percent of land has been occupied.

An airport train has been planned to serve Yogyakarta and the airport. The rail use existing rail plus 4 kilometers new rail from Kedundang Station to Temon Airport. Due to new rail is only short, so the train hopefully will be ready when the airport is ready to operate.

Local residents of the Kulon Regency have been resisting the plans for the new airport. They claim there are several environmental issues with the proposed site as well as issues of safety, due to the area being at high risk for tsunamis and other natural disasters. There is also concern that the local residents who currently make their living by farming the area would be displaced.

References

External links 

 
 Kulon Progo Tourism